The Athletic Club of Columbus or ACC, is a private social club and athletic club in Columbus, Ohio. Located at 136 East Broad Street, it was founded in 1912.

Building 
The building, dedicated in 1915, was designed by Richards, McCarty & Bulford of Columbus with Advisory Architect Frank Packard.

The club occupies a six-story building totaling . The facility includes basketball and squash courts as well as a swimming pool, bowling alley, and three restaurants. The ACC is a family-oriented club that offers a variety of activities to its 2,000 members.

In 2011, the club's building was listed on the National Register of Historic Places.

See also
 List of American gentlemen's clubs
 National Register of Historic Places listings in Columbus, Ohio

References

External links 
 
 

1912 establishments in Ohio
Sports venues completed in 1915
National Register of Historic Places in Columbus, Ohio
Spanish Revival architecture in the United States
Sports governing bodies in the United States
Sports venues in Columbus, Ohio
Basketball venues in Columbus, Ohio
Squash venues in the United States
Gentlemen's clubs in the United States
Athletics clubs in the United States
Sports organizations established in 1912
Sports venues on the National Register of Historic Places in Ohio
Broad Street (Columbus, Ohio)